This is a list of countries by risk of premature death from non-communicable disease such as cardiovascular disease, cancer, diabetes, or chronic respiratory disease between ages 30 and 70 as published by the World Health Organization in 2008. Measuring the risk of dying from target NCDs is important to assess the extent of burden from mortality due NCDs in a population.

Life tables specifying all-cause mortality rates by age and sex for WHO Member States are developed from available death registration data, sample registration systems (India, China) and data on child and adult mortality from censuses and surveys.
 
Cause-of-death distributions are estimated from death registration data, and data from population-based epidemiological studies, disease registers and notifications systems for selected specific causes of death. Causes of death for populations without usable death-registration data are estimated using cause-of-death models together with data from population-based epidemiological studies, disease registers and notifications systems.

WHO 2015 rankings

See also
Non-communicable disease
List of countries by life expectancy

References

Cancer by country
Risk of death from non-communicable disease
International quality of life rankings